Łęki Małe is a village in the administrative district of Gmina Kamieniec, within Grodzisk Wielkopolski County, Greater Poland Voivodeship, in west-central Poland.

The village has a population of 43. Close to the village are a series of burial mounds (kurgans) dating from the Bronze Age, sometimes referred to as the "Polish pyramids".

References

Villages in Grodzisk Wielkopolski County